Zero-waste fashion refers to items of clothing that generate little or no textile waste in their production. It can be considered to be a part of the broader Sustainable fashion movement. Zero-waste fashion can be divided into two general approaches. Pre-consumer zero-waste fashion eliminates waste during manufacture. Post-consumer zero-waste fashion generates clothing from post-consumer garments such as second-hand clothing, eliminating waste at what would normally be the end of the product use life of a garment. Zero-waste fashion is not a new concept - early examples of zero-waste or near zero-waste garments include Kimono, Sari, Chiton and many other traditional folk costumes.

Pre-consumer zero-waste design 
Two general approaches fall under this category, both of which occur during a garment's initial production. In zero-waste fashion design, the designer creates a garment through the pattern cutting process, working within the space of the fabric width. This approach directly influences the design of the final garment as the pattern cutting process is a primary design step. It is difficult to design a zero-waste garment solely through sketching, although sketching can be a useful speculative tool. Zero-waste manufacture, of which zero-waste design is a component, is a holistic approach that can eliminate textile waste without modifying the garment patterns. This approach allows garments and fabric to be fully used with no fabric wasted.

Zero-waste pattern designers 
Designers that have used this approach, or approaches to cutting that have an affinity with zero-waste fashion design, include

Andrew Williams 
Ernesto Thayaht
Shreya Upadhyaya
Bageeya Eco-clothing
Bernard Rudofsky
Claire McCardell
Zandra Rhodes
Emroce
Siddhartha Upadhyaya
Yeohlee Teng

Julian Roberts
Timo Rissanen
Holly McQuillan
Tara St James
Jennifer Whitty
Samuel Formo
Mark Liu
David Telfer
Julia Lumsden
MaterialByProduct
Katherine Soucie
Dusanka Duric
Daniel Silverstein
Charlene O'Brien
Baiba Ladiga
Natascha von Hirschhausen
Shelly Xu 

Danielle Elsener 
Sookhyun Kim 
Marie-Béatrice Boyer

Zero-waste manufacture 
Approaches can include the use of technology such as whole garment knitting, but often waste is eliminated by reusing the off-cuts in other products. Designers and companies that have used these approaches include:
Alabama Chanin
August (Direct Panel on Loom / DPOL) by Siddhartha Upadhyaya
Pretcastle by Shreya Upadhyaya & Siddhartha Upadhyaya
Issey Miyake
Sans Soucie
Worn Again
Recover Textile Systems
DaRousso
Tonle
Charlene O'Brien

Differences from standard fashion production 
The life expectancy of a garment has dwindled throughout the years. This has eroded the quality and decision making during the manufacturing of these pieces. Designers are seeking new ways to reuse existing garments to counter the millions of pounds in annual waste.

A standard garment production process may begin with a drawing of the desired garment, a pattern is then generated to achieve this design, a marker is made to most efficiently use the fabric, the pattern pieces are then cut from the cloth, sewn, packed and distributed to retailers. Standard garment production generates an average of 15% textile waste

Waste elimination hierarchy 
The waste hierarchy consists of the three 'R's' - Reduce, Reuse, Recycle, in order of impact. Zero-waste fashion design eliminates pre-consumer textile waste, while not necessarily addressing waste created during the use life and disposal phase of the garment's life cycle.

During textile production, many pollutants in the form of liquid, solid, and gas are emitted to the environment. The textile and apparel industry is the most polluting and has a low recycling rate of about 15%. The Zero-waste fashion design would significantly eliminate gas emissions during the production process and give any material waste proper use.

Notable contributions 
Dorothy Burnham: Cut My Cote from 1973 was a seminal text that summarised decades of Burnham's research into cuts of traditional dress.
Madeleine Vionnet's design approach aligns itself well to zero waste fashion design and many of her garments had minimal waste.
Alison Gwilt and Timo Rissanen's book Shaping Sustainable Fashion includes a number of references to zero waste fashion

Exhibitions
DPOL by Siddhartha Upadhyaya exhibited at London Science museum, Antenna Exhibition for its breakthrough in sustainable and zero waste fashion.
Bad Dogs by Timo Rissanen, UTS 2008.
ZERO Waste: Fashion Re-Patterned 2011. Curated by Arti Sandhu from Columbia College, Chicago.
YIELD: Making fashion without making waste 2011. Curated by Timo Rissanen and Holly McQuillan held at The Dowse Art Museum, New Zealand and Textile Arts Center, Brooklyn.
AUGUST & AIGHT : A commercial show of Zero Waste / DPOL products exhibited by Siddhartha Upadhyaya and Shreya Upadhyaya at Ethical Fashion Show, Paris Fashion week, Sep 1–6, 2011

References

External links 

NYTimes Article on Zero Waste

Clothing and the environment